The 1966 Speedway World Team Cup was the seventh edition of the FIM Speedway World Team Cup to determine the team world champions.

The final took place in Wrocław, Poland. The title was won by Poland for the third time.

Results

World final
 September 11
  Wroclaw

See also
 1966 Individual Speedway World Championship

References

Speedway World Team Cup
1966 in speedway